Mary Margaret “Molly” Creamer (born September 25, 1981) is a former professional basketball player who was drafted in the first round of the 2003 WNBA Draft by the New York Liberty. She is the first player from the Patriot League to be drafted into the WNBA.

A resident of Mendham Borough, New Jersey, Cramer played at West Morris Mendham High School.

College
Creamer helped Bucknell University women's basketball team qualify for its first ever NCAA Division I tournament in 2002. In her final college season she averaged 27.1 points per game (ppg), a then-Patriot League season record. When she left Bucknell, she had broken or shared 19 Patriot League records.

Honors and awards
All-time leading scorer in Patriot League history
2003 NCAA Division I Kodak/Women's Basketball Coaches Association (WBCA) All-America
Patriot league women's basketball player of the year

References

External links
Molly Creamer Basketball Player Profile, Banco di Sicilia Ribera, Bucknell, News, B stats, Career, Games Logs, Bests, Awards, - eurobasket.com
Molly Creamer Profile - Bucknell University Official Athletic Site - Bucknell University

1981 births
Living people
American women's basketball players
Basketball players from New Jersey
Bucknell University alumni
College women's basketball players in the United States
Guards (basketball)
New York Liberty draft picks
People from Mendham Borough, New Jersey
Sportspeople from Morris County, New Jersey
West Morris Mendham High School alumni